"Trenches" is a single by American hard rock band Pop Evil, released as the first single from their third studio album Onyx and is the tenth single overall from the band. The song was posted by the band on February 28, 2013.  In June of that same year, the composition became their first national number one single on Rock Radio.

Premise 
The song, which is the third part of a trilogy being presented in reverse, focuses on the struggles in the life of any individual, stating that it is important not to focus on things that they cannot control.  Lead vocalist Leigh Kakaty states that in order for a musical ensemble to stand the test of time, the ensemble must write music to which people can relate, in other words, "We have to dig our way out of the trenches".

Reviews 
Puregrainaudio describes the song as being a "hard rock masterpiece" having memorable guitar verses along with melodic choruses.

Charts

Certifications

References 

Pop Evil songs
2013 songs
2013 singles
Songs written by Dave Bassett (songwriter)
Song recordings produced by Johnny K